WWBF (1130 kHz) is a commercial AM radio station licensed to Bartow, Florida.  As the capital city of Polk County, Bartow is centrally located in the Lakeland - Winter Haven Metropolitan Area.  WWBF has a classic hits radio format and is owned by Thornburg Communications, Inc.  Its moniker is "102.9 WBF," using its FM dial position and dropping one of the two W's in its call sign.

By day, WWBF is powered at 2,500 watts non-directional.  But to avoid interference with other stations on 1130 AM, it reduces power at night to 500 watts, using a directional antenna with a three-tower array.  Programming is also heard on FM translator W275AX at 102.9 MHz.

History
It has been under the same local ownership and management since 1984. It is on a clear-channel frequency (the only AM on 1130 kHz in the state of Florida is a member of the Florida Association of Broadcasters. WWBF must reduce nighttime power to prevent interference to the Class A stations on 1130 AM, which are CKWX Vancouver, KWKH Shreveport and WBBR New York City.

On September 11, 2013, WWBF began simulcasting on FM translator W275AX on frequency 102.9.

WWBF is a division of Thornburg Communications, Inc. The station is known in the local market as Classic Hits 102.9 WBF (after its translator frequency).

Programming

WBF features a modernized version of the classic hits format playing rock & roll hits from the mid to late `60s, the `70s, and the early to mid `80s. At the core of WBF are artists like the Billy Joel, Fleetwood Mac, Stevie Wonder, Elton John, the Eagles, Rod Stewart, Hall & Oates, Creedence Clearwater Revival, the Doobie Brothers and Motown superstars.

In addition to Fox News Radio, WBF is affiliated with Westwood One, the Motor Racing Network, and the Performance Racing Network.

WWBF is also the winter radio home for Prior Smith's Canada Calling.

WWBF covers many local events; broadcasting Bartow High School football, basketball, baseball and softball. Along with coverage of the annual Youth Villa Classic golf tournament, and NASCAR.

Translators

References

External links

WBF
Bartow, Florida
Radio stations established in 1969
1969 establishments in Florida